Shannon McIntosh may refer to:
 Shannon McIntosh (racing driver)
 Shannon McIntosh (filmmaker)